Kuzolova is a rural locality (a village) in Verkh-Invenskoye Rural Settlement, Kudymkarsky District, Perm Krai, Russia.

Population
The population was 1 as of 2010. There is 1 street.

Geography 
Kuzolova is located 27 km southwest of Kudymkar (the district's administrative centre) by road. Verkh-Inva and Kovylyayeva are the nearest rural localities.

References 

Rural localities in Kudymkarsky District